Joelle Joanie "JoJo" Siwa (born May 19, 2003) is an American dancer, singer, actress and YouTuber. She is known for appearing for two seasons on Dance Moms along with her mother, Jessalynn Siwa, and for her singles "Boomerang" and "Kid in a Candy Store". Siwa posts daily videos of her day-to-day life on her YouTube channel, "Its JoJo Siwa". She was included on Times annual list of the 100 most influential people in the world in 2020.

Early life and career
Joelle Joanie Siwa was born in Omaha, Nebraska, on May 19, 2003, to Jessalynn (née Lombardi), a professional dance instructor from Iowa, and Tom Siwa, a chiropractor from Nebraska. She has one sibling, an older brother named Jayden Siwa, who is also a vlogger.

Siwa started her career as a top-5 finalist and the youngest contestant on the second season of Abby's Ultimate Dance Competition, produced by Abby Lee Miller of Dance Moms fame. She appeared on the show with her mother and was eliminated in week 9.  Siwa soon began to appear on Dance Moms, beginning with auditioning for Miller's "ALDC" dance competition team in 2014 and being selected for the team in early 2015.

In May 2016, Siwa released "Boomerang" for download and a previous single, "I Can Make U Dance". "Boomerang" addresses the subject of online bullying. Its video has been viewed more than 950 million times and received over 5 million likes. In 2018, Siwa was named the Breakout Artist of the Year by Vivid Seats.

In 2018, Siwa announced that she would be going on her first major concert tour in 2019, entitled D.R.E.A.M. The Tour. She was scheduled to visit a mixture of theaters, outdoor amphitheaters and stadiums, as well as indoor arenas in a total of 52 cities across the United States and Canada. Additionally, other performances would take place in the United Kingdom and Australia. The tour was scheduled to begin in Phoenix, Arizona on May 17. The first leg of the tour was scheduled to conclude on June 26 in Austin, Texas, before resuming for the second leg on July 10 in Orlando, Florida. The final date was scheduled for August 20 in Vancouver, Canada. She was included on Times annual list of the 100 most influential people in the world in September 2020 and on Fast Company'''s Queer 50 list in 2021.

On April 4, 2022, she was announced as a judge for the seventeenth season of So You Think You Can Dance, along with Matthew Morrison and Stephen "tWitch" Boss.

On September 9, 2022, she was announced as the recipient of the Gamechanger Award from GLSEN for her anti-bullying advocacy efforts.

Other ventures
In 2016, Siwa released a line of hair bows in a collaboration with fashion accessory and jewelry company Claire's. The line of hair bows, which were inspired by the hairbows Siwa is known herself for wearing, experienced particular success among primary school pupils in the United Kingdom, where some schools took to banning them for a variety of reasons, including peer pressure, causing distraction from work, the impairment of pupils' concentration, and violation of school dress policies. Due to the bows' popularity, some stores also began selling similar bows. In 2017, Siwa commented that her bows were a "symbol of power, confidence, believing-ness."

Siwa subsequently partnered with the American department store J. C. Penney to release a line of accessories, bedroom decor, and a doll made in her likeness, and has released several books aimed at young children.

In June 2019, the FDA issued a warning about dangerous levels of asbestos in a JoJo Siwa-branded cosmetics kit, prompting Claire's to recall the product.

Siwa signed with Nickelodeon in 2017, appearing in the film Blurt! with Jace Norman and the show Lip Sync Battle Shorties with Nick Cannon. Siwa later competed in season 3 of The Masked Singer as "T-Rex". At the age of 16, she was the youngest contestant to appear on the show until Honey Boo Boo performed as one half of "Beach Ball" in season 6. Siwa appeared as a playable character in the 2020 video game Nickelodeon Kart Racers 2: Grand Prix, as well at its 2022 sequel Nickelodeon Kart Racers 3: Slime Speedway.

In January 2021, Spin Master created a card game called "JoJo's Juice", which contained questions about nudity and theft, despite being marketed toward children ages 6 and older. Siwa later apologized and claimed she was not involved in the game's content development; the game was recalled from all toy store shelves.

Siwa competed on the thirtieth season of Dancing with the Stars, in which she was part of the first same-sex dancing partnership in the show's history. She and her partner, Jenna Johnson, ultimately placed 2nd.

In 2021 General Mills started producing a breakfast cereal called JoJo Siwa Strawberry Bop, with Siwa prominently depicted on the box. The cereal contains strawberry-flavored sweetened corn puffs with marshmallows shaped like yellow and white stars, pink bows, and blue hearts.

She is one of Time 100 Most Influential People.

During the seventeenth season of America's Got Talent, JoJo and Jessalyn formed the group XOMG Pop that were previously discovered on Siwa's Dance Pop Revolution who auditioned by singing "Candy Hearts". The judges were impressed and promoted them to the next round. JoJo and Jessalyn congratulated the group as JoJo told the judges that she is a big fan of AGT.

 Personal life 

Siwa was in a relationship with TikTok star Mark Bontempo from August to November 2020. Siwa came out as being part of the LGBTQ+ community on social media in January 2021. When a fan then asked what her label was, Siwa added that she does not label her sexuality, as she "doesn't really know this answer". She later stated "Technically I would say that I am pansexual, because that's how I have always been my whole life is just like, my human is my human." In the same interview, Siwa mentioned that she also uses the terms "gay" and "queer". She has since confirmed that she is not attracted to men.

In February 2021, Siwa revealed that she was in a relationship with her best friend, Kylie Prew, who had asked her to be her girlfriend a month prior. After a breakup in late 2021, the two confirmed in May 2022 that they were back together. Siwa and Prew broke up for a second time in June 2022. In August 2022, Siwa began dating social media content creator Avery Cyrus. In December 2022, it was announced that Siwa and Cyrus had broken up.

Bibliography
 JoJo's Guide to the Sweet Life: #PeaceOutHaterz (2017)
 Things I Love: A Fill-In Friendship Book (2018)
 JoJo Loves BowBow: A Day in the Life of the World's Cutest Canine (2018)
 JoJo's Guide to Making Your Own Fun: #DoItYourself (2018)
 JoJo and BowBow Take the Stage (2018)
 JoJo and BowBow: Candy Kisses (2019)
 JoJo and BowBow: The Posh Puppy Pageant (2019)Jingle Bows and Mistletoe (Jojo and Bowbow Super Special) (2020)The Great Beach Cake Bake (2020)Spring Break Double Take (Jojo and Bowbow Book #8)'' (2021)

Filmography

Television series

Films

Music videos

Discography

Soundtrack albums

Extended plays

Singles

Awards and nominations

References

External links

 
 

2003 births
21st-century American singers
21st-century American women singers
21st-century American LGBT people
Actresses from Omaha, Nebraska
American child singers
American female dancers
American LGBT actors
American TikTokers
American women pop singers
American YouTubers
Articles containing video clips
Child pop musicians
Dance-pop musicians
Dancers from Nebraska
Judges in American reality television series
LGBT dancers
LGBT people from Nebraska
American LGBT singers
LGBT YouTubers
Living people
Musicians from Omaha, Nebraska
Pansexual actresses
Pansexual musicians
Participants in American reality television series
Singers from Nebraska
Queer actresses